The 2010 Princeton Tigers football team was an American football team that represented Princeton University during the 2010 NCAA Division I FCS football season. The Tigers finished last in the Ivy League. Princeton averaged 7,724 fans per game.

In their first year under head coach Bob Surace, the Tigers compiled a 1–9 record, and were outscored 334 to 165. Steven Cody, Jordan Culbreath and Matt Zimmerman were the team captains.

Princeton's winless (0–7) conference record was the worst in the Ivy League standings. The Tigers were outscored 222 to 97 by Ivy opponents.

The Tigers played their home games at Powers Field at Princeton Stadium on the university campus in Princeton, New Jersey.

Schedule

References

Princeton
Princeton Tigers football seasons
Princeton Tigers football